Perry Oliver Johnson III (1924 – 23 May 1999) was a Bermudian sprinter. He competed in the men's 100 metres at the 1948 Summer Olympics.

References

External links
 

1924 births
1999 deaths
Athletes (track and field) at the 1948 Summer Olympics
Bermudian male sprinters
Olympic athletes of Bermuda
Place of birth missing
People from Sandys Parish